Bootleggers or Moonshiners is a 1961 Soviet short comedy film directed by Leonid Gaidai.

Plot summary 
The trio make moonshine alcohol in a hut hid in a forest. At work they sing about their moonshine still. Their dog takes a piece of it (a coiled condenser) and runs away. The trio chase the dog, using skis. In the end all of them run to the police department, where the bootleggers are arrested.

Cast 
 Yuri Nikulin as The Fool
 Georgy Vitsin as The Coward
 Yevgeny Morgunov as The Pro
 Vladimir Pitsek as strict militsiya officer
 Dog Rex as Dog Barbos

External links

 Bootleggers at kinoros.ru 

1961 comedy films
1961 films
1961 short films
1960s chase films
Russian comedy short films
Films about alcoholism
Films about dogs
Films directed by Leonid Gaidai
Films set in Russia
Films set in the Soviet Union
Films shot in Moscow Oblast
Mosfilm films
Russian sequel films
1960s Russian-language films
Soviet comedy films
Soviet short films